Kristopher Jansma is an American fiction writer and essayist.
Born in the Lincroft section of Middletown Township, New Jersey, he attended Johns Hopkins University and Columbia University.

Career and accolades
His short fiction has appeared in ZYZZVA, Adult Magazine, Recommended Reading, Columbia Magazine, and The Blue Mesa Review. His "Why We Write" was selected as a notable essay in Best American Essays 2014, after being published in Slice Magazine. He has also written essays and reviews for The New York Times, Salon, Electric Literature, The Rumpus, The Millions, Johns Hopkins Magazine, and The Believer.

He is the winner of the 2014 Sherwood Anderson Foundation Award for Fiction. His first novel, The Unchangeable Spots of Leopards, received an Honorable Mention for the 2014 PEN/Hemingway Award, was longlisted for the Andrew Carnegie Medal for Excellence, and was also longlisted for the Center for Fiction's Flaherty-Dunnan First Novel Prize. It was a Barnes & Noble Discover Great New Writers selection and an American Booksellers Association Indie Next Pick for April 2013.

He wrote the Literary Artifacts column for Electric Literature from 2011 to 2013.

In 2013 Flavorwire named him one of their 50 Up-and-Coming New York Culture Makers to Watch. Paper Magazine included him on their list of 2013's Beautiful People.

His second novel Why We Came to the City came out in February 2016. Michael Schaub of NPR reviewed the book and later selected the book as one of the best books of 2016.

He is an assistant professor at SUNY New Paltz College and a graduate instructor at Sarah Lawrence College. He has previously taught creative writing at Manhattanville College and SUNY Purchase College. Jansma lives in Westchester, New York with his wife and children.

Works

Books
 The Unchangeable Spots of Leopards, 2013
 Why We Came to the City, 2016

Anthologies
 Legacy: An Anthology, 2015

Essays and stories
 "The Samples", The Sun Magazine, June 2019,
 "Madame Bovary C'est Moi", Columbia Magazine, June 30, 2014
 "Don't Write About Writing", Electric Literature, June 8, 2014
 "The End, or Something", The New York Times, April 21, 2014
 "A Star Is Born", The New York Times, August 21, 2013
 "Twenty Nine Feet, Eight and a Quarter Inches", The Rumpus, March 21, 2014
 "Saving Salinger", The Millions, February 1, 2011
 "Elmore Leonard Rips off "Justified"!", Salon, January 7, 2013
 "War Stories: An Occurrence at Owl Creek Bridge", The Believer, February 1, 2013
 "The Smart Set", Johns Hopkins Magazine, March 1, 2013

References

External links

Profile at The Sherwood Anderson Foundation
“Kristopher Jansma’s Novel Approach” in Interview Magazine

21st-century American writers
American male writers
Columbia University alumni
Johns Hopkins University alumni
Living people
Manhattanville College faculty
People from Middletown Township, New Jersey
State University of New York faculty
Writers from New Jersey
Year of birth missing (living people)